Earth & Sea is the sixth studio album by Australian recording artist James Blundell, released in April 1995 by EMI. The album, a double disc set, peaked at number 31 on the ARIA Albums Chart in May 1995.

Track listing

Charts

Release history

References

James Blundell (singer) albums
1995 albums